The 1989 PBA Open Conference Finals was the best-of-7 series basketball championship of the 1989 PBA Open Conference, and the conclusion of the conference's playoffs. The San Miguel Beermen and Formula Shell Zoom Masters played for the 42nd championship contested by the league. The finals series serves as a rematch between these two teams that battled in the Third Conference finals last season.

The San Miguel Beermen repeated against the Formula Shell Zoom Masters in a similar 4–1 conquest and retains the PBA Open Conference crown.

Qualification

Series scoring summary

Games summary

Game 1

Ramon Fernandez played superb, aside from 36 points, dishing out a lot of brilliant assists that sparked the Beermen's breakaway from the very first quarter, the Zoom Masters fell behind by as much as 39 points going into the last quarter.

Game 2

Shell remained in the fight until the last minute, the Zoom Masters cut down every sizable lead of the Beermen, Fernandez lead his team in hanging tough whenever the Zoom Masters threatened with repeated rallies.

Game 3

The Zoom Masters were up by four, 124–120, with about two minutes left, a spate of errors and bad plays saw them blank the rest of the way in a 10–0 blast by San Miguel in the endgame, Bobby Parks committed a lane violation on the inbound play, with the Beermen on top, 125–124.

Game 4

Capitalizing on the absence of four-time MVP Ramon Fernandez, who was sideline due to a right, wrist sprain, the Zoom Masters leaned on the heroics of Benjie Paras and Bobby Parks to prevent a series shutout. From a 61–50 halftime lead, the Shell Zoom Masters doubled the margin and got their biggest lead at 80–57 midway in the third period.

Game 5

After keeping Shell at bay for three quarters, San Miguel broke the game wide open in the final period in a scintillating display of teamwork and hardcourt brilliance. The Zoom Masters made a gallant stand but ran out of gas and could not stop the highly charged Beermen from winning the title.

Awards
SCOOP Most Outstanding Local player in the finals series: Hector Calma (San Miguel Beer)

Rosters

Broadcast notes

References

1989
1989 PBA season
San Miguel Beermen games
Shell Turbo Chargers games
PBA Open Conference Finals